Walter Reginald Strickland (1841-1915) was a Canadian architect known for buildings such as the Dixon and Griffiths Buildings (Toronto). He was a partner in the firm Strickland & Symonds.

References

Canadian architects
1841 births
1915 deaths